Shanting is a district of the city of Zaozhuang, Shandong province, China.

Administrative divisions
As 2012, this district is divided to 1 subdistrict, 8 towns and 1 township.
Subdistricts
Shancheng Subdistrict

Towns

Townships
Fucheng Township

References

External links
 Xzqh.org

County-level divisions of Shandong